is a former Japanese football player He is the current assistant head coach J2 League club of Renofa Yamaguchi.

Playing career
Yamamoto was born in Kanagawa Prefecture on May 27, 1966. After graduating from University of Tsukuba, he joined Japan Soccer League club Mitsubishi Motors (later Urawa Reds) in 1990. He played several matches as defender. In 1992, Japan Soccer League was folded and founded new league J1 League. However he has no opportunity to play, he moved to Japan Football League club NKK in 1993. Although he played many matches, the club was disbanded end of 1993 season. In 1994, he moved to newly was promoted to J1 League club, Bellmare Hiratsuka. He retired end of 1996 season.

Club statistics

References

External links

1966 births
Living people
University of Tsukuba alumni
Association football people from Kanagawa Prefecture
Japanese footballers
Japan Soccer League players
J1 League players
Japan Football League (1992–1998) players
Urawa Red Diamonds players
NKK SC players
Shonan Bellmare players
Association football defenders